Milan Obradović (born 3 August 1977) is a Serbian football manager and former professional player who played as a defender.

Club career
Obradović made his senior debut with Radnički Beograd in the mid-1990s, before moving to Obilić in the 1998–99 season. While playing for the Knights, Obradović established himself as one of the best defenders in the league. In the summer of 2001, Obradović was transferred to Russian club Lokomotiv Moscow.

Obradović played seven seasons for Ukrainian club Metalist Kharkiv from 2006 to 2013, spending the last six months of his contract on loan at Arsenal Kyiv.

On 23 July 2013, Obradović signed a one-year contract with Partizan. On 27 July 2014, Obradović signed with OFK Beograd.

International career
Between 2000 and 2001, Obradović was a regular member of the Yugoslav national team, making seven appearances. Previously, Obradović played for the Yugoslav national under-21 team in the unsuccessful qualification campaign for the 2000 UEFA Under-21 Championship under Milovan Đorić.

Coaching career
Obradović retired in January 2015 and immediately became the assistant manager of Slavko Matić at FK Napredak Kruševac. It lasted until 25 May 2015, where the duo was fired.

Obradović continued alongside Slavko Matić and became his assistant at Slovenian club FC Koper in October 2015. On 22 March 2016, he then became the manager of Slovenian club FC Koper. The club decided to change manage on 26 September 2016 which meant, that Obradović left the club.

On 18 February 2017, Obradović was presented as the new manager of the Serbian U19 national team. In May 2017, Obradović found an agreement with FK Spartak Subotica and the club announced him as the new manager from the new season. Only few days later it came out, that Obradović had called the management of the club to tell them, that he had accepted a more lucrative offer from another club. However, the deal was only a verbal agreement and never became official.

At the end of January 2018, Obradović was hired as the assistant manager of the Serbian national team. About one year later, on 11 January 2019, Obradovic became the manager of the Azerbaijanian U21 national team.

Statistics

Notes and references

External links

 
 
 

A.P.O. Akratitos Ano Liosia players
Association football defenders
Borussia Mönchengladbach players
Bundesliga players
Expatriate footballers in Germany
Expatriate footballers in Greece
Expatriate footballers in Russia
Expatriate footballers in Ukraine
FC Arsenal Kyiv players
FC Lokomotiv Moscow players
FC Metalist Kharkiv players
FK Obilić players
FK Partizan players
FK Radnički Beograd players
OFK Beograd players
Russian Premier League players
Serbia and Montenegro expatriate footballers
Serbia and Montenegro footballers
Serbia and Montenegro expatriate sportspeople in Germany
Serbia and Montenegro expatriate sportspeople in Greece
Serbia and Montenegro expatriate sportspeople in Russia
Serbia and Montenegro international footballers
Serbia and Montenegro under-21 international footballers
Serbian expatriate footballers
Serbian expatriate sportspeople in Ukraine
Serbian football managers
Serbian footballers
Serbian SuperLiga players
Footballers from Belgrade
Super League Greece players
Ukrainian Premier League players
1977 births
Living people